Calvi is a commune in the Haute-Corse department of France on the island of Corsica.

It is the seat of the Canton of Calvi, which contains Calvi and one other commune, Lumio. Calvi is also the capital of the Arrondissement of Calvi, which contains, besides the Canton of Calvi, three other cantons: L'Île-Rousse, Belgodère, and Calenzana.
According to legend, Christopher Columbus supposedly came from Calvi, which at the time was part of the Genoese Empire. Because the often subversive elements of the island gave its inhabitants a bad reputation, he would have been expected to mask his exact birthplace.

Geography 

It is the fifth-largest commune in Corsica; however, the arrondissement is the smallest.

Climate
Calvi has a hot-summer mediterranean climate (Köppen climate classification Csa).

History
Calvi was founded in the 13th century. Its motto, "Calvi semper fidelis" ("Calvi Always Faithful"), referred originally to its loyalty to the Republic of Genoa, which instated there a closed city centre (préside) in 1278, and built a new castle in 1491 to face new artillery technologies. The motto originates from 1553 when Calvi repulsed two attacks by the French and Turks, aided by Corsican exiles.

During the war with Revolutionary France, British forces under Admiral Nelson and  Lieutenant-General Charles Stuart captured the city in the Siege of Calvi in 1794. It was during the bombardment of Calvi that Nelson sustained the injury that cost him his eye. The town was retaken by Corsicans the following year.

Population

Economy

The economy of Calvi is essentially based on summer tourism, which started in 1950 due to the pioneering efforts of Vladimir Raitz.

Transport
Calvi is served by the international Calvi - Sainte-Catherine Airport, the Xavier Colonna Port, and a metre-gauge railway line to L'Île-Rousse and Ponte-Leccia, connecting with the standard gauge main line Ajaccio - Bastia.

Monuments
Tour du Sel and the citadel
Église Sainte-Marie de Calvi

See also
Communes of the Haute-Corse department
Festival du Vent
FCA Calvi

References

External links

 Official website 

Communes of Haute-Corse
Haute-Corse communes articles needing translation from French Wikipedia
Subprefectures in France
Mediterranean port cities and towns in France